The ATmega328 is a single-chip microcontroller created by Atmel in the megaAVR family (later Microchip Technology acquired Atmel in 2016). It has a modified Harvard architecture 8-bit RISC processor core.

Specifications 
The Atmel 8-bit AVR RISC-based microcontroller combines 32 KB ISP flash memory with read-while-write capabilities, 1 KB EEPROM, 2 KB SRAM, 23 general-purpose I/O lines, 32 general-purpose working registers, 3 flexible timer/counters with compare modes, internal and external interrupts, serial programmable USART, a byte-oriented 2-wire serial interface, SPI serial port, 6-channel 10-bit A/D converter (8 channels in TQFP and QFN/MLF packages), programmable watchdog timer with internal oscillator, and 5 software-selectable power-saving modes. The device operates between 1.8 and 5.5 volts.
The device achieves throughput approaching 1 MIPS/MHz.

Features

Family 
A common alternative to the ATmega328 is the "picoPower" ATmega328P.  A comprehensive list of all other members of the megaAVR series can be found on the Atmel website.

 ATmega328
 ATmega328P and ATmega328P-AUTOMOTIVE
 ATmega328PB and ATmega328PB-AUTOMOTIVE (superset of ATmega328P) - has more UART, I2C, and SPI peripherals than ATmega328P

Applications 
ATmega328 is commonly used in many projects and autonomous systems where a simple, low-powered, low-cost micro-controller is needed. Perhaps the most common implementation of this chip is on the popular Arduino development platform, namely the Arduino Uno, Arduino Pro Mini and Arduino Nano models.

Programming 

Programming mode is entered when PAGEL (PD7), XA1 (PD6), XA0 (PD5), BS1 (PD4) is set to zero.  RESET pin to 0 V and VCC to 0 V. VCC is set to 4.5–5.5 V. Wait 60 μs, and RESET is set to 11.5–12.5 V. Wait more than 310 μs.  Set XA1:XA0:BS1:DATA = , pulse XTAL1 for at least 150 ns, pulse WR to zero. This starts the chip erase. Wait until RDY/BSY (PD1) goes high.  XA1:XA0:BS1:DATA = , XTAL1 pulse, pulse WR to zero. This is the flash write command. And so on.

Serial data to the MCU is clocked on the rising edge and data from the MCU is clocked on the falling edge. Power is applied to VCC while RESET and SCK are set to zero. Wait for at least 20 ms and then the programming enable serial instruction 0xAC, 0x53, 0x00, 0x00 is sent to the MOSI pin. The second byte (0x53) will be echoed back by the MCU.

See also 
 ATmega88
 AVR microcontrollers
 Atmel AVR instruction set
 ATtiny microcontroller comparison chart
 In-system programming

References

External links 
 Official webpages
 ATmega328 - Microchip
 ATmega328P - Microchip
 ATmega328PB - Microchip

Atmel microcontrollers